Oisu Parish was a rural municipality of Estonia, in Järva County. The parish existed until 1892. The parish was re-established in 1991. The parish was liquidated in 2005.

References

Järva County
Former municipalities of Estonia